Nugent Slaughter (March 17, 1888 – December 27, 1968) provided the special effects and sound mixing for the 1927 film, The Jazz Singer. His efforts in this project earned him a nomination for the Academy Award for Engineering Effects.

References

External links

1888 births
1968 deaths
People from Virginia
Special effects people